Siam Shade (stylized as SIAM SHADE) was a five-piece Japanese rock band, formed in Tokyo in 1991. The classic line-up of Hideki on vocals, Natchin on bass, Kazuma and Daita on guitar, and Jun-ji on drums broke onto the visual kei scene alongside a multitude of other artists in the early 1990s and enjoyed a decade of relative popularity before disbanding in early 2002. The members have reunited several times since 2007 for one-off concerts and short tours. Outside Japan, Siam Shade is best known for "1/3 no Junjō na Kanjō", which was the sixth ending theme of the Rurouni Kenshin anime. Daita's work on their song "Triptych" was named the 83rd best guitar instrumental by Young Guitar Magazine in 2019.

History

1989–2002: Formation and career
In March 1989, high school friends Hideki (then known as "Chack") and Natchin (then spelled "Natin") formed a band called Power. They won the Summer Grand Prix Award at that year's Yokohama High School Hot Wave Festival. However, due to many member changes, including the brief enrollment of guitarist Daita, Power disbanded. After befriending guitarist Ataru, singer Hideki and bassist Natchin formed a new band with him called Atæru in 1991.

In 1992, the members met Love Jets vocalist Kazuma at a talent show, and later recruited him as guitarist. Drummer A completed the lineup and Atæru began touring, playing small clubs and local venues. They changed their name in 1993, settling on Siam Shade. The band released a free demo tape on May 1, shortly after which Ataru left. In July, Hideki and Natchin called on their former schoolmate and one-time band member Daita to fill in the lead guitar slot. The group distributed the single "Doll" in December 1993. The band became close with Luna Sea, with Ryuichi Kawamura promoting Siam Shade in 1994 by playing their demo tape on his radio show.

Siam Shade had another small lineup change in 1994 when A left the band and was replaced by Jun-ji in May, solidifying the group's final lineup. Jun-ji was a roadie for Luna Sea drummer Shinya Yamada. At the end of the year, the band released their first self-titled album. In 2004, it was named one of the top albums from 1989-1998 in an issue of the music magazine Band Yarouze.

In October 1995, Siam Shade released their major label debut single "Rain" on Sony Music Entertainment Japan. Their second album Siam Shade II followed in November.

The band burst into the mainstream in late 1996 when "1/3 no Junjō na Kanjō", a single from their latest album Siam Shade IV, was selected as an ending theme for the Rurouni Kenshin anime series. The song's popularity led to increased ticket sales, concert DVDs, and television appearances.

The band continued to release albums and DVDs well into the next decade. In 2002, while touring in support of their recently released compilation albums, the band announced that they would be disbanding. Siam Shade's ten-year career came to an end on March 11, 2002 at the Nippon Budokan. Later that month, the band released their final album, Siam Shade X, a compilation of all their previous releases.

Post-Siam Shade activities
After the disbandment Hideki quickly begin his solo career. In 2003, he joined the band Acid, before leaving in 2006 to focus on his solo career again. However, in 2007 he formed Detrox with KAZ (Sads) and they released a large amount of material before going on hiatus after their show on April 18, 2012.

Kazuma also started his solo career after the disbanding. In 2003, he performed a duet with Vivian Hsu, "Moment", which was used as the second opening theme to the anime Mobile Suit Gundam SEED. He has also played support guitar for Anna Tsuchiya and Damijaw (solo project of Janne Da Arc member Ka-yu).

Daita started a solo career, wrote the soundtrack for the movie Volcano High, and played support guitar for Kyosuke Himuro. In 2005 he formed the band Binecks. In 2012, he formed the American-based band Broken Arrow with vocalist Nik Frost, who sang on the Siam Shade Tribute album.

Natin, now going by the stage-name "Natchin", has a solo career and in 2008 formed the band Big Bites with Anchang (Sex Machineguns) and Annie (The Yellow Monkey).

Junji has a solo career, was support drummer for Takanori Nishikawa a.k.a. TM Revolution, and in 2008 formed the band Bull Zeichen 88. He is also a regular support member for Acid Black Cherry.

2007–2016: Reunions
Siam Shade held a reunion concert, titled Heart of Rock, on November 18, 2007 at the Nippon Budokan, in honor of their manager who died the previous April. The band stated that the reunion was a one-off event, and would not pave the way for a new single or album release.

On October 27, 2010 a tribute album to Siam Shade was released, Siam Shade Tribute. It is composed entirely of Western artists such as Sebastian Bach, Richie Kotzen, Mike Vescera and George Lynch.

Siam Shade's song "1/3 no Junjō na Kanjō" was covered by Nogod on the compilation Crush! -90's V-Rock Best Hit Cover Songs-, which was released on January 26, 2011 and features current visual kei bands covering songs from bands that were important to the '90s visual kei movement. "Glacial Love" was covered by Guild on its sequel, Crush! 2 -90's V-Rock Best Hit Cover Songs-, that was released on November 23, 2011.

On April 29, 2011, Siam Shade announced on their new website, which went online on the same day, that they would reunite once again. This time for a free concert on July 17 at Zepp Sendai, entitled Siam Shade Spirits ~Return The Favor~, "to bring hope" to the victims of the 2011 Tōhoku earthquake and tsunami. A second concert was held on October 21 at Saitama Super Arena. The band released the album Siam Shade Spirits 1993 on April 14, 2012, which includes their entire first album, the new "opening" track called "Light For Closed Your Eyes" and two previously unreleased songs from their indie years.

The group released their first new song in 12 years "Still We Go" digitally on September 18, 2013, with a limited physical release following the next month. Siam Shade performed their first nationwide tour in 12 years at the end of 2013, titled Heart of Rock 7. The three date tour began on October 27 at Saitama Super Arena and went to Zepp Nagoya on November 11, before ending on November 12 at Zepp Namba.

Siam Shade performed at the first night of Luna Sea's Lunatic Fest at Makuhari Messe on June 27, 2015. In celebration of the 20th anniversary since their major label debut, the group held The Abiding Belief concert at Saitama Super Arena on October 18, 2015. The six date The Ultimate Fight Series tour continued the celebration and took place in February 2016 at various Zepp venues. The anniversary celebration ended with three Final Road Last Sanctuary concerts in October 2016; the Osaka International Convention Center on the tenth, the Nakano Sun Plaza Hall on the fifteenth, and the last taking place on the twentieth at the Nippon Budokan.

Members
  – vocals (1991–2002, 2007, 2011, 2013, 2015–2016)
  – bass, backing vocals (1991–2002, 2007, 2011, 2013, 2015–2016)
  – vocals, rhythm guitar (1992–2002, 2007, 2011, 2013, 2015–2016)
  – lead guitar, backing vocals (1993–2002, 2007, 2011, 2013, 2015–2016)
  – drums (1994–2002, 2007, 2011, 2013, 2015–2016)

Former members
 Ataru – guitar (1991–1993)
 Ozz... – drums
 A – drums (1992–1994)

Discography

Albums
 Siam Shade (December 10, 1994) Oricon Indies Ranking: No. 2
 Siam Shade II (November 11, 1995) Oricon Albums Chart Ranking: No. 27
 Siam Shade III (October 2, 1996) No. 20
 Siam Shade IV - Zero (January 21, 1998) No. 3
 Siam Shade V (December 2, 1998) No. 6
 Siam Shade VI (July 26, 2000) No. 8

Singles
 "Doll" (December 19, 1993, distributed for free at first one-man live)
 "Rain" (October 21, 1995) Oricon Singles Chart Ranking: No. 49
 "Time's" (February 1, 1996) No. 44
 "Why Not?" (February 21, 1997) No. 69
 "Risk" (May 21, 1997) No. 42
 "Passion" (July 30, 1997) No. 35
  No. 3
  No. 10
 "Dreams" (August 5, 1998) No. 4
 "Never End" (October 28, 1998) No. 9
  No. 8
 "Black" (September 15, 1999) No. 5
 "1999" (September 29, 1999) No. 7
  No. 10
 "Life" (April 11, 2001) No. 13
  No. 14
 "Love" (November 28, 2001) No. 20
 "Still We Go" (digital on September 18, 2013; limited CD on October 27, 2013)

Compilations
 Siam Shade VII (November 29, 2000) No. 23
 Siam Shade VIII B-Side Collection (January 30, 2001) No. 17
 Siam Shade IX A-Side Collection (March 6, 2002) No. 20
 Siam Shade X ~Perfect Collection~ (November 27, 2002) No. 98
 Siam Shade XI Complete Best ~Heart of Rock~ (September 26, 2007) No. 26
 Siam Shade XII ~The Best Live Collection~ (October 27, 2010) No. 23
 Siam Shade Spirits 1993 (April 14, 2012)

Various artists compilations
 Emergency Express 1994 (February 1, 1994, "End of Love")
 Tribute Spirits (May 1, 1999, "Pink Spider")

Tribute albums
 Siam Shade Tribute (October 27, 2010) No. 15
 Siam Shade Tribute vs Original (July 11, 2011) No. 253

Videos
 Siam Shade (VHS: March 1, 1997, DVD: December 6, 2000)
 Siam Shade V2 Clips '95 - '97 (VHS: March 1, 1998, DVD: December 6, 2000)
 Siam Shade V3 (VHS: March 20, 1999, DVD: December 16, 2000)
 Siam Shade V4 Tour 1999 Monkey Science Final Yoyogi (VHS: August 30, 1999, DVD: September 22, 1999)
 Siam Shade V5 (September 6, 2000)
 Siam Shade V6 Live Otoko ki (December 31, 2000)
 Siam Shade V7 Live in Budokan Legend of Sanctuary (March 27, 2002) Oricon DVDs Ranking: No. 34
 Siam Shade V8 Start & Stand Up Live in Budokan 2002.03.10 (May 29, 2002) No. 14
 Siam Shade V9 The Perfect Clip (January 8, 2003) No. 49
 Siam Shade Spirits ~Return the Favor~ 2011.10.21 Saitama Super Arena (March 10, 2012)
 Siam Shade Heart of Rock 7 Live at Saitama Super Arena (April 1, 2014)
 
 ~Final Road Last Sanctuary~ Siam Shade Live 2016 Live at Nippon Budokan 2016.10.20 (October 21, 2018)

References

External links
 
 Hideki Official blog
 Kazuma Official blog
 Daita Official website
 Natchin Official website
 Jun-ji Official website

Sony Music Entertainment Japan artists
Visual kei musical groups
Japanese progressive rock groups
Japanese hard rock musical groups
Japanese heavy metal musical groups
Musical groups from Tokyo
Musical groups established in 1991
Musical groups disestablished in 2002
1991 establishments in Japan